Linda nigroscutata is a species of beetle in the family Cerambycidae. It was described by Léon Fairmaire in 1902, originally under the genus Miocris. It is known from India and China. It feeds on Malus sylvestris.

References

nigroscutata
Beetles described in 1902